David Campsey Morrow (August 27, 1882 – February 27, 1953) was an American football player and coach.  He served as the head football coach at Washington and Jefferson College (1908–1911, 1919–1920, 1924–1925) and at Bethany College in West Virginia (1929), compiling a career college football record of 49–27–5.  He attended Bethany College and graduated from Washington & Jefferson.  He was one of the most widely known coaches in the eastern United States.  The New York Times called him "one of the best football coaches in the United States."  He was known for his skill in developing the line.  He spent a total of 20 years at Washington & Jefferson.

Morrow was later the manager of the South Pittsburgh Water Co.  He died at the age of 70, on February 27, 1953, at St. Joseph Hospital in Pittsburgh, Pennsylvania.

Head coaching record

See also
 List of college football head coaches with non-consecutive tenure

References

External links
 

1882 births
1953 deaths
American football tackles
Bethany Bison football coaches
Bethany Bison football players
Washington & Jefferson Presidents football coaches
Ohio University alumni
Washington & Jefferson College alumni
People from Washington County, Pennsylvania
Players of American football from Pennsylvania